The New Jersey Department of Military and Veterans Affairs is a governmental department of the state of New Jersey. It is composed of the New Jersey Army National Guard as well as the New Jersey Air National Guard. They are administered by the Adjutant General and staff which oversees the activities of the two. This includes the Disasters and Emergency Services Division and Veterans Affairs Division. The department is the official channel of communication between the federal government and the New Jersey state government on military matters.

The New Jersey State Guard, along with the New Jersey Army National Guard and the New Jersey Naval Militia, is also recognized as a component of the organized militia of New Jersey. The State Guard was last active during World War II. The Naval Militia was last active from 1999 to 2002.

In case of a state or national emergency, there is a joint federal-state program put in place for the Governor and the President respectively. This program keeps military organizations equipped, trained, and ready to counter such situations. They also cooperate with and manage state and federal agencies in order to provide services for discharged veterans and their families.

References

State agencies of New Jersey
New Jersey